In topology, a branch of mathematics, a subset  of a topological space  is said to be locally closed if any of the following equivalent conditions are satisfied:
  is the intersection of an open set and a closed set in 
 For each point  there is a neighborhood  of  such that  is closed in 
  is an open subset of its closure 
 The set  is closed in 
  is the difference of two closed sets in 
  is the difference of two open sets in 

The second condition justifies the terminology locally closed and is Bourbaki's definition of locally closed. To see the second condition implies the third, use the facts that for subsets   is closed in  if and only if  and that for a subset  and an open subset

Examples 
The interval  is a locally closed subset of  For another example, consider the relative interior  of a closed disk in  It is locally closed since it is an intersection of the closed disk and an open ball.

Recall that, by definition, a submanifold  of an -manifold  is a subset such that for each point  in  there is a chart  around it such that  Hence, a submanifold is locally closed.

Here is an example in algebraic geometry. Let U be an open affine chart on a projective variety X (in the Zariski topology). Then each closed subvariety Y of U is locally closed in X; namely,  where  denotes the closure of Y in X. (See also quasi-projective variety and quasi-affine variety.)

Properties

Finite intersections and the pre-image under a continuous map of locally closed sets are locally closed. On the other hand, a union and a complement of locally closed subsets need not be locally closed. (This motivates the notion of a constructible set.)

A topological space is said to be  if every subset is locally closed. See Glossary of topology#S for more of this notion.

See also

Notes

References
 Bourbaki, Topologie générale, 2007.

External links

 

General topology